Shangqing Township is a township in Anxi County, Quanzhou, Fujian province, China. , it has 18 villages under its administration.

See also 
 List of township-level divisions of Fujian

References 

Township-level divisions of Fujian
Anxi County